Gondangdia is an administrative village in the Menteng district of Jakarta, Indonesia. It has a postal code of 10350.

See also 

 Menteng
 List of administrative villages of Jakarta

Administrative villages in Jakarta
Central Jakarta